Michael James Lindell (born June 28, 1961), also known as the My Pillow Guy, is an American businessman, political activist, and conspiracy theorist. He is the founder and CEO of My Pillow, Inc., a pillow, bedding, and slipper manufacturing company.

Lindell is a prominent supporter of, and advisor to, former U.S. President Donald Trump. After Trump's defeat in the 2020 U.S. presidential election, Lindell played a significant role in supporting and financing Trump's attempts to overturn the election result; he spread disproven conspiracy theories about widespread electoral fraud in that election. He has also been an active promoter of the toxic plant extract oleandrin as an alternative medicine cure for COVID-19.

Background
Lindell was born in 1961 in Mankato, Minnesota. He was raised in Chaska and Carver, Minnesota. Lindell's gambling addiction began to emerge in his teenage years. He attended the University of Minnesota after high school, but dropped out a few months into his studies. In his 20s, Lindell became addicted to and a frequent user of cocaine. This addiction became worse after he switched to crack cocaine in the 1990s. Lindell was also incurring gambling debts. The build up of his addictions between the 1980s and 1990s led to the foreclosure of his house and his wife filing for divorce. Lindell stated that he achieved sobriety through prayer in 2009.

Career
In the 1980s, Lindell launched and operated a number of small businesses, including carpet cleaning, lunch wagons, and a few bars and restaurants in Carver County, Minnesota.

My Pillow

In 2004, Lindell invented the My Pillow pillow, which is filled with pieces of shredded foam that interlock. Lindell grew the business into a Minnesota manufacturing company.

In 2017, the Better Business Bureau (BBB) revoked accreditation of My Pillow, lowering its rating to an F based on a pattern of complaints by consumers. The BBB cited a buy one, get one free offer that became a continuous offer and therefore the normal price of the product, not a sale price or free offer. In a statement, Lindell said, "Naturally, I am terribly disappointed by the BBB's decision."

In 2020, Lindell named his son Darren as the company's chief operating officer, citing his own possible future political ambitions.

In 2021, some major retailers stopped carrying My Pillow products. Lindell has suggested that this is a result of his claims relating to the 2020 United States presidential election results, although outlets like Kohl's and Bed Bath & Beyond have stated this is due to market research and low customer demand.

Frank

Lindell operates two web sites under the "Frank" brand: Frank, focused on video streaming, and the social network FrankSocial.

In March 2021, Lindell detailed plans for "Vocl," an alt-tech social media platform that he had been developing for several months. He described the site as a cross between YouTube and Twitter that would be different from Gab and Parler. A dispute from a company that owned a web site called "Vocal" led Lindell to rename his site "Frank". Frank launched on the domain frankspeech.com on April 19, 2021, experiencing many technical issues, which Lindell ascribed to a "massive attack". Frank has no social networking features and primarily offers embedded video streams, including Absolute Interference, a two-hour video promoting conspiracy theories about the 2020 presidential election.

Lindell has said he has spent millions of dollars developing Frank. According to invoices published by a Salon writer, obtained from a leaked video conference with Lindell's IT team, Lindell spent about $936,000 on hardware, labor, and services to launch Frank. Jared Holt, an extremism and far-right media researcher at the Atlantic Council's Digital Forensic Research Lab, opined that Lindell was "being had by the people around him.... All the various products and ventures Lindell has going on, whether it's a pseudo-documentary film or a social media platform, are very expensive endeavors. Someone is taking Lindell's money from him to produce this stuff." Lindell told Insider in March 2022 that he was spending over $1 million per month on Frank.

FrankSocial, a social networking site hosted on a different domain, became available in April 2022. A reporter for Insider described FrankSocial as reminiscent of Facebook's design in 2012, with a basic news feed and no messaging function. Lindell had 308 followers there as of April 21, more than any other user.

Philanthropy
During the early days of My Pillow, Lindell made donations to the Salvation Army, Union Gospel Mission, and other organizations.

Lindell founded the Lindell Foundation, a non-profit organization that assists former addicts in getting treatment and other services. The foundation broadened over time, including cancer victims and veterans in their outreach.

In 2019, Lindell launched the Lindell Recovery Network, which connects addicts with others who have gone through drug addiction and the recovery process, as well as faith-based treatment centers and other recovery organizations.

Political activities
In August 2016, Lindell met with Republican presidential candidate Donald Trump, and became an avid supporter, calling Trump "the most amazing president this country has ever seen in history", following his 2016 election victory. In a speech at Liberty University in August 2019, Lindell said "When I met with Donald Trump, it felt like a divine appointment, and when I walked out of that office I decided I was going to go all in."

On October 19, 2016, Lindell attended the final presidential debate in Las Vegas. He spoke at a Trump campaign rally in Minneapolis on November 6, 2016, and attended the Official Donald Watch Party on November 8. He attended Trump's inauguration, and Trump gave him an inauguration lapel pin as a personal gift.

In 2017, Lindell sat next to Trump at an industry roundtable event at the White House.

At a rally in Fargo, North Dakota, on June 27, 2018, Trump complimented Lindell for his "business acumen". Lindell spoke at a Trump rally on October 4, 2018, in Rochester, Minnesota. Lindell spoke at the 2019 Conservative Political Action Conference, in which he promoted Trump as "the greatest president in history" and "chosen by God".

In 2019, Lindell met with Trump and his staffer on issues of opioid addiction. He was there when Trump signed a bipartisan bill that addressed the growing opioid crisis and trying to prevent opioid abuse and death.

In a March 2020 appearance on Fox News, Lindell said that his company's bedding factories had been refocused on face mask production at the behest of the Trump administration. Later that month, Lindell appeared with Trump at a White House coronavirus press conference, at which Lindell praised Trump: "God gave us grace on November 8, 2016, to change the course we were on. God had been taken out of our schools and lives, a nation had turned its back on God. I encourage you to use this time at home to get back in the word. Read our Bible and spend time with our families."

Lindell had considered running for governor of Minnesota in 2022 against Democratic incumbent Tim Walz, reportedly at Trump's urging. He attended a Republican Governors Association meeting, at which he was encouraged to run. In May 2020, he became the campaign chair for Trump's reelection campaign in Minnesota. In July 2020, Lindell said he was "99% sure" about running for Minnesota governor; Lindell ultimately did not run, and did not provide an explanation, though had previously said his decision would depend on the results of the 2020 presidential election and "if we flip Minnesota red".

In November 2020, Lindell was among those who paid for the bail of the Kenosha shooter, then-17-year-old Kyle Rittenhouse. Lindell responded to the accusations saying that he donated to "The Fight Back Foundation Inc. to help fund election fraud litigation, among other things" and that the story was "Fake News".

In April 2022, Lindell's mention of his donating as much as $800,000 to a legal defense fund for Tina Peters, a candidate for Colorado Secretary of State, raised questions as such a donation would violate Colorado state law; the state's ethics commission investigated the fund after a complaint about a lack of donor transparency.

In May 2022, Lindell rejoined Twitter, circumventing a Twitter ban on his former account. Hours after rejoining, however, Twitter terminated Lindell's newest account for ban evasion.

In November 2022, Lindell announced that he was running for Chair of the Republican National Committee. On January 27, 2023, he lost after receiving four of the 167 votes cast.

Promotion of unproven COVID-19 cure

In White House meetings with Trump and public appearances, Lindell has promoted the toxic plant extract oleandrin as a cure for COVID-19, saying, "This thing works – it's the miracle of all time." In a television appearance, Lindell made a misleading statement about the testing of the substance. Lindell has a financial stake in Phoenix Biotechnology, a company that makes oleandrin, and sits on its board. Lindell's unsubstantiated claims alarmed scientists, since there is no scientific evidence that oleandrin is a safe or effective coronavirus treatment, and there is evidence the plant is poisonous at low doses. After the efforts by Lindell and U.S. Secretary of Housing and Urban Development Ben Carson to promote oleandrin, Trump said his administration would "look at" the substance.

Attempts to overturn 2020 presidential election

After Trump's defeat in the 2020 presidential election, Lindell played a significant role in supporting and financing Trump's attempts to overturn the election result.

Lindell helped sponsor a bus tour that sought to challenge the election results. The two-week tour ended in Washington, D.C., on December 14, 2020, and Lindell spoke at five stops along the way. Lindell said that "he did not help finance subsequent trips to promote the Jan. 6 rally," referring to the rally that was followed by the storming of the U.S. Capitol by a pro-Trump mob. Lindell attended this rally, but did not go to the Capitol. Following the Capitol storming, Lindell was among those who advanced the false conspiracy theory that people associated with Antifa were responsible for the attack, saying they had probably "dressed as Trump people". On January 15, 2021, Lindell carried a document into the West Wing of the White House; the document, as seen in an enhanced photo, appeared to refer to martial law and the Insurrection Act, as well as replacing Gina Haspel with Trump loyalist Kash Patel as the CIA director.

Lindell promoted a conspiracy theory, popular with Trump supporters, that falsely claimed that voting machine companies Smartmatic and Dominion conspired with foreign powers to rig voting machines to steal the election from Trump. In January and February 2021, Dominion warned Lindell that they planned to sue him, stating in their letter: "You have positioned yourself as a prominent leader of the ongoing misinformation campaign." (The two companies sent similar letters to others as well.) After Newsmax had broadcast a "clarification" of its false reporting on voting machine fraud in response to a demand letter from Dominion, followed by a defamation suit from a company executive, Lindell appeared on the network on February 2, 2021, to repeat the false claims, as network anchor Bob Sellers tried to stop Lindell before reading a disclaimer and walking off the set.

On January 25, 2021, Twitter permanently banned Lindell for perpetuating the unfounded claim that Trump won the 2020 election. A Twitter spokesperson explained that Lindell violated the company's civic integrity policy implemented in September 2020 to fight disinformation. After his personal account was banned, Lindell circumvented the ban by using the corporate My Pillow Twitter account to issue several tweets, including a call for Twitter CEO Jack Dorsey to "be found out and should be put in prison when all is revealed!" Following the tweets, Twitter permanently banned the My Pillow account for violating the platform's ban evasion policy.

Lindell purchased three hours of airtime on One America News Network, which had also been threatened with legal action, to broadcast Absolute Proof, a documentary that makes false claims about the election, on February 5, 2021. OANN broadcast a lengthy disclaimer before the program saying the claims were Lindell's alone, but that the 2020 election results "remain disputed and questioned by millions of Americans". YouTube removed the documentary that day for violating its policy against election disinformation. At the 41st Golden Raspberry Awards, which gives awards to the films judged the worst, Absolute Proof won the Golden Raspberry Awards for Worst Picture and Worst Actor for Lindell. On April 20, 2021, Lindell published a second documentary titled Absolute Interference, which also promoted debunked conspiracy theories about the election, and criticized the news media and communism.

Dominion sent cease-and-desist letters to Lindell in December 2020 and January 2021 and asked him to retract his false claims about the company. After Lindell refused (saying "sue me"), Dominion filed suit for defamation on February 22, 2021, naming both Lindell and My Pillow as defendants and seeking US$1.3 billion in damages. In its complaint, Dominion alleges that Lindell and My Pillow used "defamatory marketing campaign—with promo codes like 'FightforTrump,' '45,' 'Proof,' and 'QAnon'—[which have] increased My Pillow sales by 30–40% and [continued] duping people into redirecting their election-lie outrage into pillow purchases"; Dominion further stated its intent was to "stop Lindell and My Pillow from further profiting at Dominion's expense". On August 11, a federal court judge ruled that Dominion's defamation lawsuit against Lindell and My Pillow can proceed, noting that Dominion has "adequately alleged" that Lindell's accusations against the company were either knowingly false or made with "reckless disregard for the truth". Smartmatic sued Lindell for defamation in January 2022, seeking unspecified damages and legal fees, asserting his false claims had reduced the company's value from more than $3 billion before the 2020 election to less than $1 billion.

In March 2021, Lindell said on Steve Bannon's War Room: Pandemic podcast he would counter-sue Dominion in cases for himself and My Pillow, accusing Dominion of racketeering and election interference. On April 19, 2021, Lindell announced that My Pillow had filed a $1.6 billion lawsuit against Dominion, arguing that Dominion had defamed the company. Stephen Shackelford, legal counsel for Dominion, stated that My Pillow's lawsuit was "a meritless retaliatory lawsuit, filed by My Pillow to try to distract from the harm it caused to Dominion". Lindell also filed a civil suit against Dominion and Smartmatic in June 2021. The day after the suit was filed, a law partner with Barnes & Thornburg who drafted and submitted the suit left the firm, which said he did not have "firm authorization" to participate in the suit. In May 2022, the federal court dismissed all the claims by Lindell and MyPillow against Dominion, Smartmatic, and their lawyers and public relations firm; the court also ruled that Lindell and MyPillow would be liable to Smartmatic for attorney's fees, in an amount to be determined, for making claims that were frivolous under Rule 11.

Lindell and others predicted various inquiries into the election would result in Trump being reinstated as president in 2021. Lindell predicted that Trump would be reinstated on the morning of August 13, stating "it'll be the talk of the world". He held a three-day "Cyber Symposium" ending August 12, promising to present "irrefutable evidence" of election fraud, but none was produced; Lindell's own cybersecurity expert said that his purported evidence was a "pile of nothing" and found no proof of election fraud. After August 13 passed and president Joe Biden remained in office, Lindell moved his prediction for Trump's return to September 30.

In September 2021, Bonner County, Idaho, announced it would perform a recount of ballots cast in the 2020 presidential election, in response to an allegation by Lindell that all 44 Idaho counties had been digitally hacked. Lindell provided a detailed list of IP addresses he asserted had been compromised. County Clerk Mike Rosedale stated that all county voting machines were fully airgapped from the Internet, also noting that seven Idaho counties do not use voting machines. Lindell alleged that a specific formula had been applied by hackers to flip votes from Trump to Biden. Rosedale said Lindell had not contacted his office before presenting his allegations. Trump carried Bonner County with 67.2% of the vote and Idaho with 63.9% in the 2020 election. At the conclusion of the Idaho recount, accuracy was determined to be within 0.1% for the election results with no indications of digital hacking. Idaho plans to bill Lindell for the cost of the recount. The Bonner audit, and audits of two other counties that do not use voting machines, affirmed the accuracy of the ballot count. Chief Deputy Secretary of State Chad Houck said Lindell would be sent a bill for the audits.

In January 2022, Lindell claimed that he possessed "enough evidence to put everybody in prison for life, 300-some million people" for their part in the alleged 2020 election fraud, which, at the time, was about 91 percent of the U.S. population.

On September 13, 2022, the FBI served a search and seizure warrant for Lindell's phone. As recounted by Lindell, speaking on his web show, agents surrounded his car at a fast-food drive-thru in Minnesota. In addition to sharing the search warrant on his show, Lindell claims FBI agents asked questions regarding a Colorado county clerk charged with election interference earlier that month.

Personal life
Lindell has been married twice. His first marriage ended in divorce after about 20 years, and he has children from this marriage. He married Dallas Yocum in June 2013 and filed for divorce in mid-July 2013 after she left him. Lindell stated that they had a prenuptial agreement.

Lindell is an evangelical Christian and received an honorary Doctor of Business from Liberty University in 2019, for his expertise as an entrepreneur. He self-published a book, What Are the Odds? From Crack Addict to CEO, that year about his addiction recovery and his developing relationship with God.

In January 2021, the Daily Mail published a story stating that Lindell had a nine-month relationship with actress Jane Krakowski between late 2019 and the summer of 2020. Both Lindell and Krakowski denied the allegation. Lindell, represented by attorney Charles Harder, sued the Daily Mail, alleging libel. A federal court dismissed the suit in December 2021, ruling that Lindell had failed to identify any statements "that a reasonable person would view as defamatory."

In March 2021, Lindell said on The Domenick Nati Show that he was no longer living in Minnesota and was not attending in-person events over safety concerns. On January 17, 2023, during the swearing-in of Dan Patrick as Lieutenant Governor of Texas for a third term, Patrick indicated that Lindell, who was attending the ceremony, had moved to Texas a few years earlier.

References

External links
 
 

1961 births
21st-century American businesspeople
American company founders
American conspiracy theorists
American evangelicals
Businesspeople from Minnesota
Living people
Minnesota Republicans
People from Mankato, Minnesota
Spokespersons